In fluid dynamics, the fluid flow is often decomposed into a mean flow and deviations from the mean. The averaging can be done either in space or in time, or by ensemble averaging.

Example
Calculation of the mean flow may often be as simple as the mathematical mean: simply add up the given flow rates and then divide the final figure by the number of initial readings.

For example, given two discharges (Q) of 3 m³/s and 5 m³/s, we can use these flow rates Q to calculate the mean flow rate Qmean. Which in this case is Qmean = 4 m³/s.

See also
 Generalized Lagrangian mean

References
 
 

Fluid dynamics